This list of exoplanets discovered in 2022 is a list of confirmed exoplanets that were first reported in 2022.
For exoplanets detected only by radial velocity, the listed value for mass is a lower limit. See Minimum mass for more information.

On 31 March 2022, K2-2016-BLG-0005Lb was reported to be the most distant exoplanet found by Kepler to date.

Specific exoplanet lists

References 

2022

exoplanets